Mooks is an Australian streetwear clothing brand, founded by graphic designer Richard Allan and brothers Peter and Stephen Hill in 1991. Design influences include manga, Japanese baseball, American college sport, and skater culture. In 2007, Mooks was acquired by the Pacific Brands conglomerate from Globe International.

According to the company, "Mook" is old New York slang for a hipster, a hustler, a wiseguy or even a fool.

References

External links

Clothing brands of Australia
Clothing companies established in 1991
1991 establishments in Australia